Congregation B'nai Israel is a former synagogue located at 327 North Negley Avenue in the Garfield neighborhood of Pittsburgh, Pennsylvania. It was built in 1923 and was added to the List of Pittsburgh History and Landmarks Foundation Historic Landmarks in 1979.

The synagogue closed in 1995 and the building was later used by the Urban League of Greater Pittsburgh Charter School. In 2021, ground was broken on a new project which will convert the building into apartments.

References

Schools in Pittsburgh
Former synagogues in the United States
Synagogues completed in 1923
Former religious buildings and structures in Pennsylvania